Amegilla canifrons, the  Canary islands Blue-banded bee is a species of bee, belonging to the family Apidae. The species is endemic to Canary Islands.

References

Apinae
Insects described in 1854